This is a list of diplomatic missions in Malaysia. At present, the capital city of Kuala Lumpur hosts 98 embassies and high commissions, while Putrajaya, the new federal administrative center, is host to one high commission. Several other countries accredit ambassadors from other capitals. This listing excludes honorary consulates.

Diplomatic missions

Embassies/High Commissions in Kuala Lumpur

High Commission in Putrajaya

Representative offices in Kuala Lumpur
 (Economic & Cultural Office)
 (Delegation)

Gallery

Consular missions

Kota Kinabalu
 (Consulate-General)
 (Consulate-General)
 (Consulate-General)
 (Consular office)

George Town
 (Consulate-General)
 (Consulate-General)  
 (Consulate-General)
 (Consulate-General)

Johor Bahru
 (Consulate-General) 
 (Consulate-General) 
 (Consulate-General)

Kota Bharu

Kuching
 (Consulate-General) 
 (Consulate-General) 
 (Consulate-General)

Tawau
 (Consulate)

Non-resident embassies and high commissions accredited to Malaysia 

Resident in Bangkok, Thailand

Resident in Beijing, China

 
 
 
 
 

 
 
 

Resident in Jakarta, Indonesia

 
 
 
 
 
 

 
 
 
 
 
 

Resident in New Delhi, India

 

 

 
 
 
 
 

 
 
 

Resident in Tokyo, Japan

 
 
 
 
 
 
 
 
 
 
 
 

Resident in other cities

 (Seoul)
 (Tallinn)
 (Hanoi)
 (Riga)
 (Seoul)
 (Valletta)
 (Hanoi)
 (San Marino)
 (Victoria)
 (Canberra)
 (Suva)
 (Port Vila)

Closed missions

See also 
 List of diplomatic missions of Malaysia
 Visa requirements for Malaysian citizens

External links 

 Ministry of Foreign Affairs of Malaysia
 Diplomatic List Kuala Lumpur

 
Malaysia
Diplomatic